American pioneers were European American and African American settlers who migrated westward from the Thirteen Colonies and later United States to settle in and develop areas of North America that were occupied by Native Americans.

The pioneer concept and ethos greatly predate the migration to the Western United States, with which they are commonly associated, and many places now considered "East" were settled by pioneers from even further east. For example, Daniel Boone, a key figure in American history, settled in Kentucky, when that "Dark and Bloody Ground" was still undeveloped.

One important development in the Western settlement was the Homestead Act, which provided formal legislation for the settlers which regulated the settlement process with little concern for the Native inhabitants on the land.

Etymology
The word "pioneer" originates with the Middle French pionnier (originally, a foot soldier, or soldier involved in digging trenches), from the same root as peon or pawn. In the English language, the term independently evolved a sense of being an innovator or trailblazer. As early as 1664, Englishman John Evelyn used the term with a self-effacing "workman" meaning when he wrote in his treatise on planting, Sylva, or A Discourse of Forest-Trees: "I speak now in relation to the Royal Society, not my self, who am but a Servant of it only and a Pioneer in the Works".

Pioneers

Various figures in American folklore and literature typify the pioneer.  James Fenimore Cooper's The Deerslayer (1841) became the most successful of his early series, the Leatherstocking Tales, about pioneer life in the Province of New York.  Laura Ingalls Wilder's Little House on the Prairie series, published a century later in 1932–1943 but set in the 1870s and 1880s, typified later depictions of pioneer families. Daniel Boone (1734–1820) and Davy Crockett (1786–1836) became two real-life icons of pioneer history.

Historic details and episodes

History of settlement efforts

The first westward migrations  occurred as representatives of the Thirteen Colonies sought to open up new lands for their respective colonies westward. Those whose original royal charters did not specify a western limit simply extended their lands directly and indefinitely westward. 

After the United States was formed upon the ratification of the U.S. Constitution, federal coordination and legislation began to give settlement a more unified approach. 

The Land Ordinance of 1785 was the first official action by the federal government in deciding how political organization of new territories would be handled. The Northwest Ordinance of 1787 was a major step, declaring that states could not individually claim new lands, but exploration would be handled by the national U.S. government. In the Land Act of 1804, the federal government took its first steps towards legislating the manner in which pioneer lands would be individually claimed and distributed. 

Further evidence of the government's involvement in encouraging western settlement was the publication of The Prairie Traveler, published in 1859, three years before the Homestead Act's passage.  Randolph B. Marcy, Captain of the U.S. Army was commissioned  by War Department to provide a guide for those moving west.  It provided not only mileage and stopping points during travel but also gave advice about what to take on the journey, how to interact with Native Americans and also how to respond to threatening situations such as encounters with bears.

There were many other forms of this process, such as land runs including the Land Run of 1889, in Oklahoma, which occurred when parts of the territory of Oklahoma were first opened, allowing anyone to claim land on a first-come, first-serve basis.

Details of pioneer efforts and actions
As western settlement grew, certain common details began to emerge. Most pioneers traveled in wagon trains, groups of wagons containing settlers and their families. They banded together for common defense and to combine their efforts. 

Pioneers in the East often had to clear the land, owing to lush forests there. In the Midwest, the task was to bring agricultural fertility to the Great Plains.

Some pioneers were drawn with the original intent of claiming lands and settling their families. Others were trappers, or others who went west for commercial reasons, and remained there as residents when their businesses proved to be profitable.

Popular culture and folklore
The figure of the pioneer has played a large role in American culture, literature and folklore. The pioneer is not the only iconic figure which figures in the settlement of the West. Much cultural note is given to other figures of a more transient nature, such as cowboys, trappers, prospectors, miners etc. However, the pioneer alone represents those who went into unexplored territory in search of a new life, looking to establish permanent settlement. 

Various figures in American folklore and literature typify the pioneer.  The Deerslayer was the most successful of an early series, the Leatherstocking Tales, about pioneer life in New York.  Little House on the Prairie, a century later, typified a later series of novels describing a pioneer family. Daniel Boone and Davy Crockett are two real-life icons of pioneer history.

See also

 American frontier
 American pioneers to the Northwest Territory
 American West
 Donation Land Claim Act of 1850
 Frontiersman
 Land Act of 1804
 Land grant
 Military Tract of 1812
 Mormon pioneers
 Preemption Act of 1841
 Public Land Survey System
 Settler
 Wagon train

References

 
History of United States expansionism